Districts (Malay: Daerah; Jajahan in Kelantan) are a type of administrative division below the state level in Malaysia. An administrative district is administered by a lands and district office (pejabat daerah dan tanah) which is headed by district officer (pegawai daerah).

Classification
In Peninsular Malaysia, a district is a subdivision of a state. A mukim (commune, sub-district or parish) is a subdivision of a district. In recent years, a mukim is however of less importance with respect to the administration of land; for land administrative purposes, major cities (e.g. Petaling Jaya) are given an equal status with mukim.

The state of Perlis is not divided into districts due to its size, but straight to the mukim level. The Federal Territories are also not divided into districts; however Kuala Lumpur is divided into several mukim for land administration purposes. Putrajaya is divided into precincts.

In East Malaysia, a district is a subdivision of a division (bahagian) of a state. For example, Tuaran is a district within the West Coast Division of Sabah. A district is usually named after the main town or its administrative capital; for example, the town of Sandakan is the capital of the Sandakan District, as well as the capital of Sandakan Division.

Some larger districts are further divided into autonomous sub-districts (daerah kecil; literally "small district") before the mukim level. This is prevalent in Sarawak and Sabah, but also seen in Peninsular Malaysia in recent years, e.g. Lojing autonomous sub-district in Kelantan. Sub-districts in Sabah, however, are not divided into mukim.

Relationship with parliament and local government
An administrative district can be distinguished from a local government area where the former deals with land administration and revenue while the latter deals with the planning and delivery of basic infrastructure to its inhabitants. Administrative district boundaries are usually congruent with local government area boundaries, but may sometimes differ especially in urbanised areas. For example, the Petaling District in Selangor is administrated by three local authorities: Petaling Jaya City Council, Shah Alam City Council and Subang Jaya City Council; conversely one local authority can administer more than one district, for example Northeast Penang Island District and Southwest Penang Island District in Penang are both administrated by Penang Island City Council.

Administrative district boundaries also provide the basis of boundaries for the parliamentary constituencies in the Malaysian Parliament. However this is not always the case; in heavily populated areas e.g. the Klang Valley and Kinta Valley there is serious overlap between district, local government and parliamentary boundaries.

By states

West Malaysia

East Malaysia

Townships (Mukim)
In the 11 states of the Peninsular Malaysia including the Federal Territories, there are townships (precinct for Putrajaya) that been administered by the district office and also the state government. For a list, see :Category:Mukims of Malaysia.

Gallery

Labelled maps

Maps

See also
 District
 Amphoe
 County
 Governorate, Regierungsbezirk, Oblast, Raion, Vilayet
 List of capitals in Malaysia
 List of districts in Malaysia by population
 Local government in Malaysia

Notes

References

External links 

 

 
Subdivisions of Malaysia
Districts
Malaysia 2, Districts
Districts, Malaysia